Enjo Kiongozi (born 27 March 1990) is a Tanzanian cricketer. He played in the 2014 ICC World Cricket League Division Five tournament.

References

External links
 

1990 births
Living people
Tanzanian cricketers
Place of birth missing (living people)